Amyotrophy is progressive wasting of muscle tissues. Muscle pain is also a symptom. It can occur in middle-aged males with type 2 diabetes. It also occurs with motor neuron disease.

Differential diagnosis 
The following are considered differential diagnosis for Amyotrophy:
 compressive and infective causes of polyradiculopathy
 structural disc diseases
 chronic demyelinating neuropathies

See also
 Diabetic amyotrophy
 Monomelic amyotrophy
 Amyotrophic lateral sclerosis

References

External links 

Muscular disorders